The MAAC men's basketball tournament (popularly known as the MAAC Tournament) is the conference championship tournament in basketball for the Metro Atlantic Athletic Conference (MAAC). The tournament has been held every year since 1982, the MAAC's first season. It is a single-elimination tournament and seeding is based on regular season records. The winner, declared conference champion, receives the conference's automatic bid to the NCAA men's basketball tournament. The MAAC did not receive its automatic bid from the NCAA until 1984.

The tournament has used several formats in its history, though seeding in all formats has been based strictly on conference record (with tiebreakers used as needed). When the tournament began in 1982, the conference had six members: Army, Fairfield, Fordham, Iona, Manhattan, and Saint Peter's. It used a standard single-elimination bracket that gave the 1 and 2 seeds a first-round bye into the semifinals, with the bottom four seeds playing in the first round at the highest seeded team's home court. The semifinals, and championship games were played at the Meadowlands Arena until 1990, when it was moved to the Knickerbocker Arena. The conference used this setup in the 1982, 1983, 1984, 1988, and 1989 tournaments. After the 1989 tournament, each game would be played at a venue chosen by the league. 1982, 1984, and 1985 also implemented a consolation game played by the losers of the semifinal round.

In 1984, the conference expanded to eight teams, adding La Salle and Holy Cross, and no longer giving the 1 and 2 seeds first round/quarterfinal byes. In 1990, the conference expanded again, adding Canisius, Loyola MD, Niagara, and Siena to bring the number of teams to twelve. To compensate for this, the MAAC was broken into North and South divisions. 1991 saw the conference lose Army, Holy Cross and Fordham to the Patriot League, thus bringing the total number of members to nine. This tournament setup used an 8 vs 9 play-in game in the first round. This setup continued for two seasons until La Salle left the MAAC for the Mid Western Collegiate Conference, bringing current membership to eight teams again.

Starting in 1993, the MAAC went back to the previous setup for eight teams, 1 vs. 8, 4 vs. 5, 3 vs. 6, and 2 vs. 7. This system was used until 1998, when the MAAC expanded yet again, adding Marist and Rider from the NEC. With ten teams, a first round play-in format was used, with the bottom four teams playing a first round "play-in" game. The 1 seed would play in the quarterfinals against the highest remaining seed from the first round. This format was used until 2003, when the MAAC implemented a new format, and expanded to the bottom six teams playing in the first round, and giving the 1 seed a bye into the semifinals. The reasoning was to place a significant premium on in-season play. In 2007, they ended the change, citing the NIT awarding bids to conference regular season champions who fail to win their conference's tournament championship. Instead of the 1 seed playing the highest remaining seed from the first round, the MAAC used a basic bracket style. 7 vs. 10 and 8 vs. 9 in the first round, with the 8/9 winner facing the 1 seed, and the 7/10 winner facing the 2 seed. This continued through 2013, when the MAAC expanded once more.

In the spring of 2014, the MAAC added Monmouth and Quinnipiac from the Northeast Conference, while losing Loyola MD to the Patriot League. This brought the MAAC to eleven members, and the first round was again expanded to include the bottom six teams competing in the play-in round. As of 2022, this is the current system being used.

List of finals

Results by team
All records are completed through championship game of 2021–22 season

Team win–loss records

† No longer a member of the MAAC

Championship game team win–loss records

† No longer a member of the MAAC

Team head-to-head results

† No longer a member of the MAAC

Championship game team head-to-head results

† No longer a member of the MAAC

NCAA Tournament appearances

 2020 NCAA tournament was canceled due to COVID-19.

Results by seed
Completed through championship game of 2021–22 season

Seed win–loss records

Championship game seed win–loss records

Results by coach
Completed through championship game of 2021–22 season

Coach win–loss records

Championship game coach win–loss records

Broadcasters

Television

Radio

References

 
Recurring sporting events established in 1982